King Ngqungqushe  was the King of the Mpondo state of modern-day Transkei.He succeeded his father, Chief Nyawuza in june 1782 until his death in 1809. During what was an eventful reign, the Grosvenor, East Indiaman a British vessel ran aground on the 4 August 1782 at the coast of the land of this region at a Lambasi with 123 survivors, causing consternation on Chief Ngqungqushe leading him to order the survivors to be slain for fear of them ravaging his people and stealing cattle. This is despite the fact that a smaller number of survivors on previous shipwrecks, (the Sao Jao, the Sao Bento etc,) would be assimilated into the Xhosa cultural way of life and sometimes assisted to get to their destination by the hospitable but fierce amaMpondo.

Death

Sometime in the 1810's K intervened in a succession dispute among the AmaBomvana People who had been a Mpondo vassal state for centuries, on behalf of his son in law, Ngezana who was married to KING NGQUNGQUSHE'S DAUGHTER. Confident of the military prowess of his amaMpondo who had never been conquered, the confident King led his army Southwest after briefly assembling at his Vungeni great place. He crossed into Bomvana territory assured of victory. 

The combined AmaMpondo Military  force under King Ngqungqushe control together with a band led by Ngezana attacked King Gambushe who was a regent at the time, forcing the regent and his forces to retreat. While savouring the taste of their victory AmaMpondo and their King Ngqungqushe relaxed for the night on the banks of Dangwana River on their way home enjoying the spoils of a victory well earned. Unbeknownst to them, the AmaBomvana regent King Gambushe had reorganized his forces and surprised the relaxed AmaMpondo Military army with great force. In the ensuing chaos, King Ngqungqushe's Royal guard was overtaken and King Ngqungqushe KaNyawuza was "sent to meet his ancestors" in otherworld.

Having not secured the succession of his heir, the relatively young Prince Phakane kaNgqungqushe, King Ngqungqushe was to be succeeded by his lower ranking son Prince Faku kaNgqungqushe who usurped the heir Prince Phakane with the help of the Royal Court. During the time of King Ngqungqushe the AmaMpondo Royal state, consisting of many vassal chiefdoms, was located near the coast along both sides of the Mthatha River and extended along the coast roughly to the Mzimkhulu River to the northeast and the Mthatha river to the southwest.

References

Monarchs of South Africa
18th-century monarchs in Africa
19th-century monarchs in Africa
19th-century South African people